is a Japanese manga written and illustrated by Kuroha, serialized by Square Enix's Gangan Online service. A 12-episode anime television series adaptation by Nomad aired between July and October 2013.

Plot
The story follows a group of high school girls who are in the 'Going-Home Club'. Instead of doing regular club activities, the 'Going-Home Club' is dedicated to having as much fun as possible, by doing such things as playing video games or even simply feeding pigeons in the park.

Characters

  
One of two freshman who joined the Going Home Club at the start of the school year.  She is the member of the club with a straight and serious personality and she generally does not get the jokes that the club members are giving.

  
Supervisor of the Going Home Club and the other new member at the start of the school year. She is airheaded, but is excellent at home economics. She joined the Going Home Club because she could not decide between joining the Handicraft Club or the Cooking Club. Her cute looks are greatly admired by the club members to the point that it has become Botan's biggest weakness.

  
The president of the Going Home Club. She is the self-proclaimed ordinary girl of the club. She has an energetic personality.

 
 
 Treasurer of the Going Home Club. She is the heiress to her family's mega-corporation. She enrolled at the school because she wanted a normal school life.

 Commander of the Going Home Club. She is an expert in various martial arts as she is the successor to an ancient martial arts school. Her skills are so highly developed that other kids became afraid of her until meeting Sakura. Despite being invincible, Karin's cuteness has proven to be her Achilles' heel.

The mascot of the club, yet it is not perceived by other members. It also acts as narrator in some situations.

Media

Manga

Anime
An anime television series, directed by Hikaru Sato and produced by Nomad aired from July 4 to October 11, 2013 Nippon TV. The series has been licensed for simulcast streaming in the North America by Crunchyroll. NIS America later added the Chronicles of the Going Home Club anime set for both retail and streaming release.

References

External links
 Official Anime Website 
 

2010s webcomics
2013 anime television series debuts
2013 Japanese television series endings
2014 webcomic endings
Anime series based on manga
Comedy anime and manga
Japanese comedy webcomics
Gangan Online manga
Nomad (company)
Nippon TV original programming
School life in anime and manga
Seinen manga
Television shows based on Japanese webcomics
Webcomics in print